Orozimbo Barbosa Puga (March 5, 1838 – August 28, 1891) was a Chilean politician and military figure who played a major role in the Occupation of the Araucanía (1861–1883), the War of the Pacific (1879–1883) and the Chilean Civil War (1891).

References

1838 births
1891 deaths
People from Chillán
Chilean people of Portuguese descent
Senators of the Constituent Congress of Chile (1891) 
Chilean Army generals
People of the Occupation of Araucanía
Chilean military personnel of the War of the Pacific
People of the Chilean Civil War of 1891 (Balmacedistas)